Xu Wu (born 9 March 1993) is a Chinese footballer who currently plays as a defender for Chongqing Lifan.

Club career
Xu Wu was promoted to the senior team of Chongqing Lifan within the 2019 Chinese Super League season and would make his debut in league game on 17 July 2019 against Shenzhen F.C. in a 2-0 victory where he came on as a substitute for Peng Xinli.

Career statistics

References

External links

1993 births
Living people
Chinese footballers
Association football defenders
Chinese Super League players
Chongqing Liangjiang Athletic F.C. players